The Tamron 18-200mm F/3.5-6.3 Di III VC is an APS-C superzoom lens announced by Tamron on December 8, 2011. It can be mounted on Canon EOS-M and Sony E-mount (NEX) camera bodies.

Build Quality
The lens features an all-plastic construction with rubber focus and zoom rings. The barrel of the lens telescopes outward from the main lens body as it's zoomed in from 18mm to 200mm. To combat zoom creep, the lens features a small zoom lock switch on the main lens barrel.

The zoom lens features a wide range of focal lengths, from wide angle at its shortest to super-telephoto at its longest.

See also
Sony E 18-200mm F3.5-6.3 OSS LE

References
http://www.dpreview.com/products/tamron/lenses/tamron_18-200_3p5-6p3_di_iii_vc/specifications

Superzoom lenses
18-200B
Camera lenses introduced in 2011